Salt Lake City has an extensive public art collection. Works have included:

 145th Field Artillery Monument, Memory Grove
 2002 Winter Olympics Countdown Clock, Arena station
 A Monument to Peace: Our Hope for the Children, Jordan Park
 Abstract Bronze Fountain
 All Is Well
 Allegorical Figures, City and County Building
 An Urban Allegory
 Angel Moroni, Temple Square
 Arch
 Asteroid Landed Softly
 Bauta Stone, Jordan Park
 Beehive sculptures, Utah State Capitol
 Benches, Pierpont Walkway
 Black Lives Matter street mural
 Brigham Young Monument
 Bronze Birds, Pierpont Walkway
 Charles R. Savage
 Bust of Mahatma Gandhi, International Peace Gardens, Jordan Park
 Celebration of Life Monument
 Chief Massasoit
 Children's Wall
 Coal Man Machine, First Security Bank
 Column 24, Salt Lake Art Center
 Counterpoint
 Crystal Grate, One Utah Center
 The Diver, Jordan Park
 The Doll and Dare
 Dolmen Replica, Jordan Park
 Dream Dog, Warm Springs Park
 Earthworks, Constitution Park
 Edgehill Ward Mural
 Fault Line, Fault Line Park
 Fire House Fire
 Fireman on Ladder
 Firemen Cutout
 Fruited Plain II, One Utah Center
 Gilgal
 Go for the Gold
 Handcart Pioneers, Temple Square
 Healing, University of Utah
 Hearts, Pierpont Walkway
 Herons in Flight
 Hyrum Smith, Temple Square
 Irish Cross, Jordan Park
 John Rockey Park, University of Utah
 Joseph Smith, Temple Square
 Korean War Wall of Honor, Memory Grove
 Landscape Architecture, Pierpont Walkway
 Lest We Forget, Pioneer Memorial Museum
 The Little Mermaid, Jordan Park
 Lupine Meadow Roll
 Lupita, the Woman, Guadalupe Park
 May We Have Peace
 Morgan Commercial and Normal College Marker
 The Mormon Battalion War Memorial
 Nauvoo Bell, Temple Square – includes Benevolence and Pioneering
 Olmec Head Replica, Jordan Park
 One Hundred Birds
 Our Lady of Beauraing, Belgium
 Pagoda, Memory Grove
 (Pair of Cougars)
 The Peace Child of Hiroshima, University of Utah
 Peace Cradle, Gallivan Center and Jordan Park's International Peace Gardens
 Pierpont Walkway Water, Pierpont Walkway
 Pioneer Monument
 Places for Birds, One Utah Center
 Places for People
 Point of View, Salt Palace
 The Pony Express, Pioneer Trails State Park
 Portal, One Utah Center
 Preaching Buddha, Jordan Park
 Priesthood Restoration, Temple Square
 Puepahk Tugypahgyn Noomwevehchuh Psehdtuhneeyet, Triad Center
 Rococo-Coco
 Sculptured Wall
 Seagull Monument
 Seated Mermaid, Jordan Park
 Sidewalk Piece in Parts
 Solar Wind, Salt Lake Community College
 Sorrow
 Spirit Poles, International Peace Gardens, Jordan Park
 Statue of Eliza R. Snow
 Statue of Patrick Edward Connor
 Statue of Vasilios Priskos
 Story Wall, One Utah Center
 Stream of Life, City Creek Center
 Sugar House Pioneer Monument, Sugar House
 This Is the Place Monument
 Three Football Players, University of Utah
 Through the Shelter of Love
 The Tree
 Tribute to the Nation's Constitution and Flag
 Two Chinese Lions, Jordan Park
 Uinta
 Untitled (Allen), Wells Mini Park
 Untitled (Caravaglia), Federal Building
 Untitled (Johnston), Liberty Park
 Untitled (Riggs), Parks and Recreation building
 Untitled (Riswold), Memory Grove
 Untitled (Smith), First Security Bank
 Untitled (Strand, Nobis), One Utah Center
 Untitled (Swain), Taufer Park
 Untitled Fountain
 Utah Jazz mural
 Utah Sandscape, One Utah Center
 Utah Women 2020
 Ute Brave, University of Utah
 Water Walk, One Utah Center
 Wildlife Wall, One Utah Center
 Windwheel #9
 Zucker Fountain, Memory Grove

See also

References

External links

 Salt Lake City Arts Council
 Public art projects
 by district

Culture of Salt Lake City
Salt Lake City
 
Public art in Utah
Tourist attractions in Salt Lake City
Public art